The North West Counties A.R.L. were a series of rugby league regional leagues in the North West of England. Most clubs at open age level joined the North West Men's League in 2011 and 2012 but it carried on until folding part way through the 2014-15 season .

The league is linked to the British Amateur Rugby League Association (BARLA).

History

Following the formation of British Amateur Rugby League Association in 1973, local District Leagues got together and pooled their resources. The North West Counties was formed by a merger of Leigh, Manchester, St Helens, Warrington, Widnes and Wigan districts. The NWCL began in 1975 with three divisions.

2014/15 line up
Clock Face Miners (failed to complete the season)
Golborne Parkside
Halton Simms Cross
Higginshaw
Salford City Roosters (failed to complete the season; results stood)
Thatto Heath Crusaders
Wigan St Cuthberts (failed to complete the season; results stood)
Woolston Rovers (failed to start the season)
NB: The league folded when only four clubs remained

2013/14 line up

Upper Division
Albert Park (folded midseason; results stood)
Blackbrook (dropped to Lower Division part way through season) 
Dalton
Eccleston Vikings (folded midseason; results stood)
Golborne Parkside
Higginshaw (folded midseason; results stood)
Hindley (dropped to Lower Division partway through season)
Irlam Hornets (withdrew midseason; results stood)
Leigh East (dropped to Lower Division part way through season)
Whitworth Spartans (folded midseason; results stood)
Widnes Moorfield (folded midseason; results stood)
Wigan St Cuthberts

Lower Division
Blackbrook (withdrew midseason; results stood)
Hindley (midseason additions dropping down from Upper Division)
Ince Rose Bridge
Leigh East (withdrew midseason; results expunged)
Oldham St Annes
Rochdale Mayfield (withdrew midseason; results expunged)
Pilkington Recs (withdrew midseason; results stood)

2012/13 line up
Albert Park
Blackbrook* 
Blackpool Scorpions (failed to complete the season, results expunged)
Dalton
Eccles & Salford Roosters* (failed to complete the season, results expunged)
Golborne Parkside
Higginshaw
Irlam Hornets
Langworthy Reds
Leigh East*
Rochdale Mayfield* (failed to complete the season, results expunged)
Rylands Sharks
Thatto Heath Crusaders* (failed to complete the season, results expunged)
Widnes Moorfield
Widnes Tigers
Widnes West Bank* (failed to start the season)
NB: Clubs marked by a * run their main team in summer.

NW Counties 13-15s ARL

Based at Golborne Parkside Sports & Community Club and meeting on the first Wednesday of the month, the NW Counties 13-15's ARL have 105 teams and over 2,000 players registered for the 2012 Season.

Teams compete at three separate age groups i.e. under-13, under-14 & under-15 and participate in usually 4 divisions per age.

League games are played on Sunday mornings from the beginning of March with clubs competing for a series of silver NW Counties League Cups.

A further knock-out cup competition is also run and leads, at the end of July, to the season's finale the NW Counties 13-15s Cup/Development Cup Finals weekend.  The League, along with the 8-12s & 16-18s Leagues also jointly run the NW Counties' Lancashire Cup which is now held at a professional ground.

The Winners of the Lancashire Cup usually go forward at U13s & U15s to represent the NW Counties 13-15s in an annual Easter-time Wars of the Roses Challenge against their equivalent champions from the Yorkshire Juniors ARL.

The League also hold a Presentation Day, at Chorley Town Hall, in November to hand out their medals and trophies.

The NW Counties 13-15's Management Committee comprises:

 Kevin Davidson  - Chair
 Margaret Byrne  - Vice-Chair
 Dave O'Dowd     - Secretary
 Jayne Bissett   - Treasurer
 Dave O'Dowd     - Under-13's Fixture Secretary
 Steve Samuel    - Under-14's Fixture Secretary
 Steve Davies    - Under-15's Fixture Secretary
 Tammy Smith     - Child Welfare Officer
 David Lowe      - Disciplinary Secretary
 Gareth Palmer   - Referee Appointments Officer
 David Lowe      - Registrations/Transfers Secretary
 Lindsay Bissett - Committee Member

See also

 British Amateur Rugby League Association
 British rugby league system
 National Conference League
 Pennine League
 CMS Yorkshire league
 Cumberland League
 Hull & District League
 Barrow & District League

External links
 NW Counties Junior & Youth Official Website
 NW Men's League Official Website (includes results and tables)
 BARLA Official Website

Rugby league in Cumbria
Rugby league in Lancashire
Rugby league in Greater Manchester
Rugby league in Merseyside
BARLA competitions